Reply 1988 is a South Korean television series starring Lee Hye-ri, Ryu Jun-yeol, Go Kyung-pyo, Park Bo-gum, and Lee Dong-hwi. Beginning in the year 1988, it revolves around five friends and their families living in the same neighborhood of Ssangmun-dong, Dobong District, Northern Seoul. It aired every Friday and Saturday from November 6, 2015, to January 16, 2016, on tvN for 20 episodes.

Reply 1988 is the third installment of tvN's Reply series. It received both critical and audience acclaim with its finale episode recording an 18.8% nationwide audience share, making it the fifth highest rated drama in Korean cable television history and highest rated television drama at the time of airing.

Cast

Main 

Lee Hye-ri as Sung Deok-sun/Sung Soo-yeon
The middle child of her family, she is infamously ranked 999th in school and is the only girl in their group of five neighborhood friends. Though not academically gifted, Deok-sun has a bright and compassionate personality. She cares deeply for her friends and classmates but feels lost without a "dream" to pursue. Deok-sun moves through the stages of her youth alongside her male friends, and the mystery of which of them she eventually marries is a continual point of tension for viewers throughout the series.
Ryu Jun-yeol as Kim Jung-hwan
Stoic and sarcastic, but with a secretly sweet heart, Jung-hwan (called Jung-pal by his friends) is one of the leaders of the neighborhood group. Jung-hwan is handsome, smart, and athletic, often taking on extra feelings of responsibility to fulfill the dreams of his older brother Jung-bong, who has a chronic heart condition. While Jung-hwan doesn't often share his emotions with others, he feels things deeply and uses his sarcasm and attitude as a shield. He develops feelings for a neighborhood friend early but is reluctant to admit his crush, even as the right timing slips away.
Go Kyung-pyo as Sun-woo
A class president, caring brother, and dependable son to his widowed mother, Sun-woo is an ideal young man. He is devoted to his friends and dotes on his younger sister, Jin-joo. Sun-woo harbors a secret crush on a neighborhood friend that lingers into adulthood.
Park Bo-gum as Choi Taek
An internationally renowned genius Baduk player, Taek is the quietest of his neighborhood friends. Taek dominates on the Baduk board but struggles with simple everyday tasks. His Baduk success has brought money and fame but has left him distant from his age group, so he relies on his neighborhood friends for companionship, grounding, and a connection to other teens. Taek is generous to a fault and hesitant to make a fuss, but that hesitancy disappears in competition. However, when he realizes that the person he cares for has another admirer, he has to weigh romance against friendship.
Lee Dong-hwi as Ryu Dong-ryong
The neighborhood clown, Dong-ryong loves to sing, dance, and play jokes on his friends. Like Deok-sun, Dong-ryong is not a natural academic, but his thoughtful insight and surprising wisdom serve him and his friends well. As the son of two working parents surrounded by tight-knit families, Dong-ryong sometimes feels neglected by his parents and makes up for their absence by acting out. He is known for his disgusting nature whilst with the group, much to the anger of the others. His nosy nature means that he ends up knowing many of the neighborhood's secrets before anyone else.

Recurring 
Sung family

Sung Dong-il as Sung Dong-il (Deok-sun's father)
A fraud and security specialist at a bank, Dong-il fell into debt after lending money to a friend who never paid it back. He struggles to provide for his family as he wants to while paying off the debt, but does his best to give everything he can to his children. He and his wife, Il-hwa, argue a lot but love each other very deeply.
Lee Il-hwa as Lee Il-hwa (Deok-sun's mother)
Il-hwa is a kind woman who spends much of her time with the other moms and caring for her family. She worries about her children and husband and shows much of her care by cooking massive quantities of food to share with her family and the neighborhood.
Ryu Hye-young as Sung Bo-ra (Deok-sun's older sister). 
Bo-ra is a tough-as-nails college student who wants to become a lawyer. While outwardly stoic, she has a warm heart and shows compassion to those who need it most. Where Deok-sun struggles academically but excels at interpersonal relationships, Bo-ra is a stellar student who stumbles in social and emotional situations. 
Choi Sung-won as Sung No-eul (Deok-sun's younger brother)
Dong-il's only son and assistant in his schemes, No-eul is a kindhearted young teen with a poetic, dreamer's mind.

Kim family

Kim Sung-kyun as Kim Sung-kyun (Jung-hwan's father)
Sung-kyun is a kind and humorous man who runs an electronics store. He loves to joke and play with the neighborhood kids, and generally keeps an air of joviality among the adults. Although he often seems childish and unhelpful to her, he adores his wife, Mi-ran, and hopes for good futures for his sons.
Ra Mi-ran as Ra Mi-ran (Jung-hwan's mother)
A strong lady with a tough past, Mi-ran is the indisputable empress of the Kim household. Worried and annoyed about Jung-bong and his constant academic failures punctuated by collecting obsessions, Mi-ran can sometimes come off as short-tempered. This short temper is really an expression of her anxiety and love for her children and family.
Ahn Jae-hong as Kim Jung-bong (Jung-hwan's older brother)
A student who failed his college entrance exam six times, Jung-bong would rather collect posters and stamps, solve Rubik's cubes and play arcade games than studying and thinking about his future. He has an often childlike personality and is easily distracted. Nevertheless, Jung-bong is kind, thoughtful, compassionate, and easy to like. He happily cares for the neighborhood kids including Jin-joo, Sun-woo's little sister. He is a surprisingly poetic romantic.

Sun-woo family

Kim Sun-young as Kim Sun-young (Sun-woo's mother)
A kind young widow, Sun-young dotes on her children as much as possible, probably to try to make up for their father's absence. She struggles with her mother-in-law and does her best to keep the family afloat. With a sunny personality and an upbeat disposition, she is always looking for the best side of any situation and can make even the most bear-like person laugh.
Kim Seol as Jin-joo (Sun-woo's little sister)
A precocious toddler, doted on by everyone in the neighborhood. Jin-joo adores sausages, bananas and red bean buns. She loves her older brother but is a bit more reserved with others.

Neighborhood residents

Choi Moo-sung as Choi Moo-sung
Taek's father and the owner of a watch store, Bonghwangdang, at the entrance to the alley. Moo-sung moved to the Ssangmun neighborhood after the death of his wife. He was adopted into the neighborhood family as he raised Taek by himself. Quiet and reserved, Moo-sung's unassuming exterior conceals hidden depths of emotion and compassion for his son, his friends, and the neighborhood as a whole.
Yoo Jae-myung as Ryu Jae-myung (Dong-ryong's father)
A dean at the local boys' high school, Jae-myung once harbored dreams of being a dancer. Now focused on shaping the men of the future, he does his best to keep his son in check while still enjoying his life.

Extended

Lee Min-ji as Jang Mi-ok (Deok-sun's friend)
A student born into a house of good wealth. A good friend to Deok-sun and Ja-hyun, she is practical and excitable. Gets in trouble with family after she starts dating someone from Deok-sun's neighborhood.
Lee Se-young as Wang Ja-hyun (Deok-sun's friend)
A constant friend to Deok-sun and Mi-ok, Ja-hyun is focused on boys and becoming a hairstylist.
Lee Mi-yeon as adult Sung Deok-sun
Kim Joo-hyuk as the husband of adult Deok-sun
Jeon Mi-seon as adult Sung Bo-ra
Woo Hyun as adult Sung No-eul
Lee Chung-mi as Nam Goong Neul-bo	
Lee Jin-kwon as Bad student	
Seo Cho-won as Supporting
Park Ah-sung as Student
Nam Mi-jung as Fortune teller
Oh Hee-joon as Soccer Teammate
Jang Hee-jung as National Singing contest judge
Song Young-kyu as Sun-young's older brother
Yong Young-jae as director of Korea Baduk Association
Bae Yoo-ram

Special appearances 

Kim Young-ok as Deok-sun's grandmother (ep. 2) 
Jung Won-joong as Dong-il's older brother (ep. 2)
Kim Soo-ro as snack shop owner (ep. 3)
Lee Moon-sae (voice) as radio DJ (ep. 6)
Park Ji-yoon as TV interviewer (ep. 7)
Park Jeong-min as Bo-ra's boyfriend (ep. 8)
Kim Tae-hoon as Cardiac surgeon (ep. 8)
Lee Soo-kyung as Lee Soo-kyung, No-eul's girlfriend (ep. 8)
Jung Yoo-min as Bo-ra's friend (ep. 8)
Jung Hae-in as Ho-young, Deok-sun's middle school friend (ep. 13)
Shin Young-jin as Class President's mother (ep.14)
 Ahn Sung-ki (ep. 17)
Jung Woo as Trash (ep.18)
Go Ara as Sung Na-Jung (ep.18)
 Son Eun-seo as Deok-sun's colleague (ep 18, 19 and 20)
 Yoo Dam-yeon as Department Head Jo, Dong-ryong's mother (ep 18 and 20)
 Ko Chang-seok as Mi-ok's father (ep 19)
 Lee Jong-hyuk (voice) as adult Sun-woo (ep 20)

Episodes

Production

Reply 1988 marked the third collaboration between director Shin Won-ho, screenwriter Lee Woo-jung and actors Sung Dong-il and Lee Il-hwa after Reply 1997 (2012) and Reply 1994 (2013). Kim Sung-kyun, who co-starred in 1994 also joined the cast. The first script-reading was held in August 2015. Choi Taek, played by Park Bo-gum, was loosely based on the real-life Go player, Lee Chang-ho.

Unlike the previous Reply series, 1988 focused more on filial bond than romance between characters with director Shin saying that most of the story was about family, and only a small fraction was about Deok-sun's love.

Original soundtrack 
Like its predecessors, the soundtrack for Reply 1988 also consists of remakes of old songs.

Part 1

Part 2

Part 3

Part 4

Part 5

Part 6

Part 7

Part 8

Part 9

Part 10

Part 11

Ratings
In this table,  represent the lowest ratings and  represent the highest ratings.

Awards and nominations

References

External links 
  
 
 

2010s teen drama television series
2015 South Korean television series debuts
2016 South Korean television series endings
TVN (South Korean TV channel) television dramas
Korean-language television shows
Television series set in 1988
Television shows set in Seoul
Television series by CJ E&M
South Korean comedy-drama television series